RoboTurb is a welding robot used to repair turbine blades developed at Universidade Federal de Santa Catarina. It is a redundant robot with a flexible rail.

The Roboturb project started in 1998 at the Universidade Federal de Santa Catarina initially with the support of the Brazilian Government and the public power utility
company COPEL – Companhia Paranaense de Energia Eletrica.

Three phases followed, and now the project is mainly maintained by another  public power utility company  FURNAS – Furnas Centrais Eletricas.

References 

 RoboTurb Project (2004).  The Roboturb Project. In Portuguese Retrieved Dec. 5, 2004.
 Robotics Laboratory at UFSC.  Robotics laboratory.  Retrieved Oct. 12, 2006.

Industrial robots
1988 robots
Robots of Brazil